The WTA Tournament Awards are a series of annual Women's Tennis Association (WTA) awards given since the 1995 WTA Tour to the most successful tournaments on the WTA calendar. No awards were given in 2020 due to the shortening of the season caused by the COVID-19 pandemic

Premier Mandatory Tournament of the Year

Premier 5 Tournament of the Year

Premier Tournament of the Year

International Tournament of the Year
From 1995–2013 one tournament was recognised, from 2014–2016 the award has been distributed in regional categories. From 2017 on, the award was given to one tournament.

Americas

Asia / Pacific

Europe / Middle East

References

External links
 WTA website

WTA Awards